Zonder may refer to:

De Man Zonder Hart, 1937 Dutch drama film directed by Léo Joannon
Ingenieurs zonder Grenzen, (Dutch for Engineers Without Borders), a name used by two Belgian organisations
Zonder, an alien from The King of Braves GaoGaiGar
Mark Zonder (born 1958), the drummer of American heavy-metal band Warlord
Orkest Zonder Naam (Nameless Orchestra) was the orchestra of the catholic broadcasting corporation KRO during the pillarization of Dutch society
Zonder Ernst, sitcom made for and aired in the 1990s by Dutch broadcasting organization NCRV

See also
 Zonda (disambiguation)
 Zander (disambiguation)